Chris Phillips is an American voice actor and musician. He is known for his roles in Rockstar games such as Marty Chonks and El Burro in Grand Theft Auto III and his role as Alex Balder, Mercenary and Killer Suit in Max Payne. He is also well known for his roles in Atari games including Nolaloth, Thunderbelly, Lorne Starling, Koraboros and Prison Leader in Neverwinter Nights 2 and Crowley in Alone in the Dark.

Biography

Chris Phillips might also be well known as the voice of Face, the former mascot of Nickelodeon's Nick Jr. block. Phillips voiced Face from September 5, 1994 until August 29, 2003, with Phillips returning to voice him for a surprise appearance on the New Year's countdown with Stick Stickly on TeenNick's The '90s Are All That block in 2011. In Easter (March 27), 2016, Phillips also returned to voice Face on NickSplat's YouTube video "Are You An Easter Bunny?". Phillips was also one of Cartoon Network's continuity announcers from 1992 to 1997 and returned to the network in 2007 as the announcer for its "Invaded" event. Phillips voiced many characters on the animated series Doug (Disney) and also became the voice of Roger Klotz and Boomer Bledsoe as Billy West left. Other animated series Phillips has worked on include PB&J Otter for Disney, Beavis and Butt-Head for MTV, Generation Jets for CBS, and Bubble Guppies and Team Umizoomi for Nickelodeon. Phillips did voice work for the award-winning PBS show Between the Lions and has been in numerous "TV Funhouse" episodes for Saturday Night Live.

Animated film credits include Felix the Cat: The Movie as the Professor, and Grumper, Roger Klotz and various voices in Doug's 1st Movie, and various voices in Osmosis Jones, directed by Bobby and Peter Farrelly.

Phillips has provided voice work for a number of video games, including Grand Theft Auto III, Max Payne 1 & Max Payne 2: The Fall of Max Payne, Mafia: The City of Lost Heaven, Red Dead Revolver, Alone in the Dark and Neverwinter Nights 2.

His voice has appeared on TV and radio commercials for Cartoon Network, Nickelodeon, Comedy Central, Comcast, Honey Nut Cheerios, eBay, Rolaids, Arby’s, Cocoa Puffs, Miller Lite, Lucky Charms, New York Lottery, Cingular, FedEx, and Pepto-Bismol, to name a few.

He appeared in the Denis Leary specials No Cure for Cancer, Lock 'n Load, and Douchebags and Donuts, and directed and appeared in the off-Broadway version of No Cure for Cancer. He was also in Leary's holiday special Merry F %$in' Christmas for Comedy Central, (Phillips wrote and produced the title song) and was also co-author of the book of the same name. Phillips also writes all of Leary's songs with him and produces his CDs. He has received a platinum album for the single "Asshole" and a gold record for No Cure for Cancer.

Phillips has written and produced music for American Motors cars and Ethan Allen Furniture commercials. He co-wrote and performed the theme for Shorties Watching Shorties for Comedy Central and is in the house band for The Comedy Central specials Comics Come Home. Phillips and his band The Enablers are the backup band for Denis Leary; they released their own CD entitled Everest. Chris Phillips is currently the secondary continuity announcer for Nick Jr.

Filmography

Film

Television

Video games

Other

References

External links
 
 Chris Phillips at Filmbug

Living people
American male video game actors
American male voice actors
20th-century American male actors
21st-century American male actors
Year of birth missing (living people)
Place of birth missing (living people)